Hendrickson Organ Company is a manufacturer of pipe organs based in St. Peter, Minnesota.

Charles Hendrickson founded the company in 1964.  Since then, over 100 contracted pipe organ projects have been completed.  Along with new pipe organs, the firm has restored old instruments, relocated instruments, and rebuilt and enlarged existing pipe organs.  The firm also provides regular service work and tuning for approximately fifty organs.  Charles Hendrickson serves as the President of the company.  Sons Eric and Andreas Hendrickson are in charge of operations, design, and service.

Notable instruments 
 Church of St. Peter, St. Peter, Minnesota (3 manuals, 40 ranks, 1981 Pipes, Opus 99, 2001).  Opus 99 includes pipes from the church's former instrument, Hendrickson Opus 53, which was severely damaged in the 1998 1998 Comfrey – St. Peter tornado outbreak.
 Wayzata Community Church, Wayzata, Minnesota (4 manuals, 70 ranks, Opus 92, 1998)
 St. Joseph Cathedral, Sioux Falls, South Dakota (3 manuals, 62 ranks, Opus 78, 1991)
 Luther College (Iowa), Decorah, Iowa (2 manuals, 36 ranks, Opus 10, 1971)
 St. Wenceslaus Catholic Church, New Prague, Minnesota (43 ranks, 3  manuals, 30 stops, 2152 pipes, Opus 47, 1979)

References

External links 
 Hendrickson Organ Company

Pipe organ building companies
Musical instrument manufacturing companies of the United States